Knema latifolia is a species of plant in the family Myristicaceae. It is a tree found in Sumatra and Borneo.

References

latifolia
Trees of Sumatra
Trees of Borneo
Least concern plants
Taxonomy articles created by Polbot